Maryland Route 275 (MD 275) is a state highway in the U.S. state of Maryland. Known as Perrylawn Drive, the highway runs  from MD 222 and MD 824 in Perryville north to MD 276 in Woodlawn in western Cecil County. MD 275 provides an eastern bypass of the town of Port Deposit. The state highway also serves to connect the town of Rising Sun (via MD 276) and Interstate 95 (I-95). MD 275 was constructed along a new alignment in the mid-1960s.

Route description

MD 275 begins at a four-way intersection with MD 222 and MD 824 (Blythedale Road) in the town of Perryville. MD 222 heads west toward Port Deposit as Bainbridge Road and south as Perryville Road toward an interchange with I-95 (John F. Kennedy Memorial Highway) and the center of Perryville. MD 275 heads north as Perrylawn Drive, a limited-access two-lane undivided highway. The highway heads north along a long, sweeping curve that passes to the east of the town limits of Port Deposit. MD 275 parallels Mill Creek and crosses the stream twice along its course. The state highway reaches its northern terminus at MD 276 (Jacob Tome Memorial Highway) in the community of Woodlawn.

MD 275 is a part of the National Highway System as a principal arterial for its entire length.

History
MD 275 was constructed along a new alignment between July 1965 and October 1967.

Junction list

See also

References

External links

MDRoads: MD 275
MD 275 at AARoads.com

275
Maryland Route 275